Hong Kong competed at the 2008 Asian Beach Games held in Bali, Indonesia from October 18, 2008, to October 26, 2008. Hong Kong finished with 3 gold medals, 3 silver medals, and 2 bronze medals.

Nations at the 2008 Asian Beach Games
2008
Asian Beach Games